Steens Mountain is in the southeastern part of the U.S. state of Oregon, and is a large fault-block mountain. Steens Mountain is not part of a mountain range but is properly a single mountain, the largest of Oregon's fault-block mountains.

The Steens Mountain Wilderness encompasses  of Steens Mountain.  of the Wilderness are protected from grazing and free of cattle.

History
The mountain was called the "Snowy Mountains" by John Work, one of the fur traders who were the first Europeans in the area. It was renamed in 1860 for United States Army Major Enoch Steen, who fought and drove members of the Paiute tribe off the mountain. American Indians used the Steens Mountain, particularly Big Indian Gorge.

Geology

The east face of Steens Mountain is composed mainly of basalts stacked one upon another. Lava flows several hundreds of feet thick inundated the region between 17 and 14 million years ago. Chemical data from magma deposits from the area reveal three distinct stages of volcanism.

Layers of clay and volcanic dust show over forty lava flows on Steens Mountain. As the surface cracked, peaks and valleys were formed. Erosion and landfalls continue to modify the faces of the cliffs along the mountain. The sediment bedding is roughly horizontal, evidence to the absence of compressional forces. The white sediments consist primarily of stratified acidic tuffs. While rain hasn't been a main contributor to erosion, ice and snow melt are the main sources of erosion on Steens Mountain.

Flora and fauna

Vegetation in the Steens Mountain Wilderness varies greatly according to elevation. Common plants include sagebrush, juniper, various species of bunchgrass, mountain mahogany, aspen, mountain meadow knotweed, and false hellebore. Other vegetation endemic to Steens Mountain includes Steens paintbrush (Castilleja pilosa var. steenensis), moss gentian (Gentiana fremontii), Steens Mountain penstemon (Penstemon davidsonii var. praeteritus), Steens Mountain thistle (Cirsium peckii), a dwarf blue lupine, and Cusick's buckwheat (Eriogonum cusickii).

Although other mountains of the Great Basin also lack conifers, Steens Mountain is the largest mountain area without conifers. One possible cause of the absence of conifers is the isolation of Steens Mountain, although lack of seed dispersal by bird species such as Clark's Nutcracker may also be a factor. It is also possible that prehistoric fires, including fires used by Native Americans, eradicated the conifer population. Home to a wide variety of animals, the area is primarily known for birding, hunting, and fishing. Birds here include Golden eagles, owls, and the protected sage grouse. Other animals found in the area include rattlesnakes, scorpions, elk, bighorn sheep, pronghorn antelope, and cougars. The area is home to wild horses. Drawing much controversy, the Bureau of Land Management engages in wild horse roundups every few years, employing helicopters to herd the horses. Historically, Steens Mountain Wilderness was once home to grizzly bears; a skull was unearthed in nearby Malheur Lake. In the 1970s, a wolverine was trapped and released on Steens Mountain.

Environmental protection

On October 24, 2000, President Bill Clinton approved the Steens Mountain Cooperative Management and Protective Act. The act was created by local landowners in cooperation with local and national government representatives in response to a proposed National Monument. This act created the Steens Mountain BLM Cooperative Management and Protection Area, a  area.

Activities
The west slope of Steens Mountain is traversed by a  loop road, which is suitable for passenger vehicles. It is possible to drive almost to the summit of the mountain and to other viewpoints such as Kiger Gorge. Steens Mountain is also host to Steens Mountain High Altitude Running Camp.

Other recreational activities enjoyed on and around Steens Mountain are camping, picknicking, bicycling, hiking, hunting, sightseeing, soaring, and exploring. There are numerous hot springs along the base of Steens Mountain, including Alvord Hot Springs. Far from city lights, stargazing is also popular.

See also

 Steens Mountain Wilderness

References

External links

 
 
 
 Two more Sentinel-2 satellite images of Steens Mountain
 Steens Mountain Cooperative Management and Protection Area – BLM page

Mountains of Oregon
Landforms of Harney County, Oregon
Protected areas of Harney County, Oregon
Bureau of Land Management areas in Oregon